The 1890–91 season was the ninth season in the history of Burnley Football Club and their third in the Football League. Burnley ended the season in eighth position with a record of 9 wins, 3 draws and 10 defeats, thus finishing outside the bottom four for the first time. Scottish forwards Claude Lambie and Alexander McLardie were the top goalscorers, with 16 and 14 league goals respectively. Burnley progressed to the Second Round of the FA Cup for the first time in two years, before being knocked out by Notts County. During the season 24 different players were used by Burnley, with many of the squad hailing from Scotland. In the 6–2 win against Preston North End on 7 March 1891, striker Tom Nicol became the first and only Burnley player to score a hat-trick on his League debut.

Football League

Match results

Final league position

FA Cup

Lancashire Senior Cup

Player statistics
Key to positions

CF = Centre forward
FB = Fullback
GK = Goalkeeper

HB = Half-back
IF = Inside forward
OF = Outside forward

Statistics

References

Burnley F.C. seasons
Burnley